Rezaabad (also Romanized as Reẕāābād) is a village in Isar Rural District, Marvast District, Khatam County, Yazd Province, Iran. At the 2006 census, its population was 75, in 20 families.

References 

Populated places in Khatam County